Strong Medicine is an American television series. 

Strong Medicine may also refer to:

Strong Medicine (book), a 1962 book by Blake F. Donaldson
Strong Medicine (film), a 1981 drama directed by  Richard Foreman 
Strong Medicine (novel), a 1984 novel by Arthur Hailey